Georg von Kunheim (July 1532 – 18 October 1611), born in the Prussian city of Wehlau (modern Znamensk) and died in Mühlhausen (modern Gvardeyskoye),  married Margaretha Luther, youngest daughter and child of Martin Luther on August 5, 1555.

After Margaretha's death in 1570, George von Kunheim married Dorothea von Oelsnitz (1558 - February 2, 1602).

References

1532 births
1611 deaths
German untitled nobility
People from the State of the Teutonic Order
Martin Luther family